Brazilian militias, in Rio de Janeiro and other cities of Brazil, are criminal, illegal paramilitary groups made up of current and former police (Civil/Military) officers as well as Military Firefighters Corps officers, criminals, politicians, and military officers. They carry out both vigilante and organized crime activities. In the favelas where the authorities have effectively lost control, drug gangs like ADA and Red Command often reign supreme, openly selling drugs and carrying weapons as well as acting as the de facto authorities, building infrastructure and enforcing their own brand of law and order. Police-backed militias force out the drug traffickers, only to set up their own protection rackets, extorting residents and taxing basic services.

History
The militias have their roots in the death squads of the Brazilian military dictatorship in 1964. They emerged in the late 2000s, being made up of off-duty police officers with assistance from local businessmen who need protection from armed gangs.

Because of their close ties to the police force, the militias also enjoy the support of certain politicians.

From 2006, the Comando Vermelho started a conflict against the militias.

Politicians 

Cesar Maia, Rio de Janeiro major in 1993-1997 and 2001-2009 have give support to militias; in his words, "Community self-defense" and "An evil better than drug gangs".

In 2008, a group of journalists were kidnapped and tortured by a militia; they were in disguise to document the militia's action. Between the involved are the 2 politicians, Colonel Jairo and his son Dr. Jairinho.

Even in 2008, innumerable civilians have been killed by militias trying to incriminate the local drug dealers and trying to enforce the political candidacy of Carminha Jerominho.

In popular culture 
 Corrupt police are the subject of the 2010 film Elite Squad: The Enemy Within.
 The Crachá Preto, a fictional far-right paramilitary group with ties to the police, are the secondary antagonists in the 2012 video game Max Payne 3.
 An unnamed militia serves as the main enemy force in the missions Takedown and The Hornet's Nest in the 2009 video game Call of Duty: Modern Warfare 2, and its 2020 remake, Call of Duty: Modern Warfare 2 Campaign Remastered

See also
 Crime in Brazil
 Paramilitarism in Colombia
 Grupos de Autodefensa Comunitaria
 Wallace Souza
 Pancasila Youth
 Marielle Franco

References

Police brutality in Brazil
Far-right politics in Brazil
Corruption in Brazil
Organized crime groups in Brazil
Vigilantes